Michael Minden Hodgins  (26 August 1912 – 11 May 1998) was the inaugural Archdeacon of Hackney:  a post he held from 1951  to 1971.
Born into a military family 
and educated at Wellington College, Berkshire, he was ordained after a period of study at Ripon College Cuddesdon in 1939. After a curacy at St Barnabas, Northolt Park he was Secretary of the London Diocesan Fund from 1946 to 1974.

References

1912 births
People educated at Wellington College, Berkshire
Alumni of Ripon College Cuddesdon
Archdeacons of Hackney
1998 deaths